Maria Cosma is a Romanian sprint canoer who competed in the mid to late 1970s. She won five medals at the ICF Canoe Sprint World Championships with a silver (K-1 500 m: 1977) and four bronzes (K-1 500 m: 1974, 1978; K-4 500 m: 1973, 1974).

References

Living people
Romanian female canoeists
Year of birth missing (living people)
ICF Canoe Sprint World Championships medalists in kayak